Nergård (historically spelled Nergaard) may refer to the following:

Nergården (or just Nergård), a village in Bjarkøy, Troms county, Norway
Nergård AS, a large fishing company in Northern Norway, based in Tromsø

People
Arnfinn Nergård, Norwegian politician for the Centre Party
Arvid Nergård, Norwegian bishop in the Church of Norway
Leiv Nergaard, Norwegian businessman
Silje Nergaard, Norwegian jazz vocalist and songwriter
Torger Nergård, Norwegian curler